C. imitator may refer to:

Carenum imitator, a ground beetle species
Carinotetraodon imitator, a pufferfish species
Cirripectes imitator, a fish species
Copelatus imitator, a diving beetle species